New Madrid is a city in New Madrid County, Missouri, United States. The population was 2,787 at the 2020 census. New Madrid is the county seat of New Madrid County. The city is located 42 miles (68 km) southwest of Cairo, Illinois, and north of an exclave of Fulton County, Kentucky, across the Mississippi River.

The town is on the north side of the Kentucky Bend in the Mississippi River, which is also known as "New Madrid Bend" or "Madrid Bend." The river curves in an oxbow around an exclave of Fulton County, Kentucky. Scientists expect the river eventually to cut across the neck of the peninsula and make a more direct channel, leaving the Kentucky territory as an island.

New Madrid was the epicenter of the very powerful 1811–12 New Madrid earthquakes.

History

The first more or less permanent settlement at present-day New Madrid was established by bands of Shawnee, Delaware, Creek, and Cherokee who were turned into refugees due to the U.S. War for Independence. These refugee Native American bands accepted Spanish offers to settle on the west bank of the Mississippi River in the early 1780s. These mixed Native American groups established a settlement and informal trading post where a northward, horseshoe bend of the Mississippi met the Chepusa creek, which provided an easy place for landing boats. Native American hunters and European-American merchants made the settlement a location for processing the bounty of hunts, including the valuable but messy fat of bears and buffalo, which was used in preparing skins and furs. The settlement quickly acquired the name L’Anse a la Graise — “Cove of Grease” or “Greasy Cove.”    

European Americans renamed the settlement New Madrid in about 1780 under the auspices of Spanish Governor Bernardo de Gálvez, who was appointed to rule Spanish Louisiana (the land west of the Mississippi River), and Manuel Pérez, Lieutenant Governor of Upper Louisiana in Saint Louis. They welcomed settlers from the United States, but required them to become subjects of the Spanish crown. In addition, they had to agree to live under the guidance of his appointed empresario, Colonel George Morgan, an American Revolutionary War veteran from New Jersey. Morgan recruited a number of American families to settle at New Madrid, attracting a few hundred people to the region. Settlement in the 1790s and early 1800s remained relatively low due to the physical geography of New Madrid and its hinterlands. The Mississippi frequently washed away the town's river banks, and a Spanish fort was washed away. Surrounded by low, swampy land, New Madrid developed a well-earned reputation for illnesses, especially in the summer and fall. Spanish censuses taken in the late 1790s recorded around 800 residents at the village of New Madrid. New Madrid continued to operate as a site of exchange between Native Americans in the St. Francis River Valley and European American traders operating out of New Madrid.  

In 1800, Spain traded the territory back to France in the Third Treaty of San Ildefonso. After trying to regain control of Saint-Domingue (the present Haiti), where a slave rebellion was underway, Napoleon gave up on his North American colonies, agreeing to sell this territory to the United States in 1803 as part of the Louisiana Purchase.

The area is noted as the site of a series of more than 1,000 earthquakes in 1811 and 1812, ranging up to approximately magnitude 8, the most powerful non-subduction zone earthquake ever recorded in the United States. New Madrid lies far from any plate boundaries, but it is on the New Madrid Seismic Zone. The major earthquake was felt as far away as the East Coast.

During the Civil War, the Battle of Island Number Ten took place on the Mississippi River near New Madrid.

In the antebellum period, this fertile floodplain area was developed for cotton plantations, based on the labor of enslaved African Americans. They were emancipated after the Civil War and worked to make new lives. As whites struggled to re-establish dominance after the Reconstruction era, they intimidated and attacked blacks under the guise of Jim Crow laws, working to suppress voting and control their activities. Three African-American men are documented as being lynched by whites in New Madrid, the county seat, near the turn of the century: Unknown Negro, on November 29, 1898; Louis Wright, a musician in a minstrel show accused of altercations with whites, hanged on February 17, 1902; and unknown Negro, May 30, 1910.

By the turn of the 20th century, some industry was being developed in New Madrid, which contained two lumber mills, a grist mill, a stave and heading factory, and a cotton gin. It was considered a rough town. There were four Protestant churches, two with independent African-American congregations, and one Catholic church. In 1900, 1,489 people lived in New Madrid; in 1910, the population was 1,882.

Geography 
New Madrid is located at  (36.59, -89.54).

Climate
New Madrid has a humid subtropical climate (Köppen Cfa) with hot, humid summers and chilly, though not severe winters. Winter weather can vary from very mild and rainy when air masses from the Gulf of Mexico predominate, to very cold, dry and windy with northerly or northwesterly airflows as in the famous cold month of January 1977. On average there are 82 nights which fall to or below , whilst one night falls to or below , and the coldest temperature ever has been  on January 17, 1982. The hottest has been  record on August 4, 1964, whilst an average of 2.9 days exceed .

Rainfall is fairly heavy throughout the year due to moist air from the Gulf being advected on the western side of the Bermuda High, plus occasional remnant depressions from hurricanes passing up the Mississippi Valley.

Demographics

2020 census
As of the census of 2020, there were 2,787 people, 1,307 households, and 711 families living in the city. The racial makeup of the city was 70.30% White, 28.10% Black or African American, 0.30% Native American, 0.26%, and 1.30% from two or more races. Hispanic or Latino of any race were 3.20% of the population.

There were 1,307 households, of which 20.7% had children under the age of 18 living with them, 37.8% were married couples living together, 11.0% had a female householder with no husband present, 5.5% had a male householder with no wife present, and 45.6% were non-families. 40.5% of all households were made up of individuals, and 17.2% had someone living alone who was 65 years of age or older. The average household size was 2.09 and the average family size was 2.73.

The median age in the city was 47.2 years. 14.9% of residents were under the age of 18; 7.8% were between the ages of 18 and 24; 24.6% were from 25 to 44; 29.1% were from 45 to 64; and 23.6% were 65 years of age or older. The gender makeup of the city was 48.9% male and 51.1% female.

The median income for a household in the city was $41,445, and the median income for a family was $54,476. The per capita income for the city was $22,046. About 14.80% of families and 21.0% of the population were below the poverty line, including 32.6% of those under age 18 and 19.3% of those age 65 or over.

2010 census
As of the census of 2010, there were 3,116 people, 1,276 households, and 809 families living in the city. The racial makeup of the city was 72.30% White, 25.55% Black or African American, 0.22% Native American, 0.26% Asian, 0.13% from other races, and 1.54% from two or more races. Hispanic or Latino of any race were 0.80% of the population.

There were 1,276 households, of which 32.3% had children under the age of 18 living with them, 39.9% were married couples living together, 18.2% had a female householder with no husband present, 5.3% had a male householder with no wife present, and 36.6% were non-families. 32.4% of all households were made up of individuals, and 14% had someone living alone who was 65 years of age or older. The average household size was 2.34 and the average family size was 2.94.

The median age in the city was 39.8 years. 24.1% of residents were under the age of 18; 7.8% were between the ages of 18 and 24; 23.6% were from 25 to 44; 28.3% were from 45 to 64; and 16.1% were 65 years of age or older. The gender makeup of the city was 47.9% male and 52.1% female.

2000 census 
As of the census of 2000, there were 3,334 people, 1,275 households, and 882 families living in the city. The population density was 738.3 people per square mile (284.8/km). There were 1,414 housing units at an average density of 313.1 per square mile (120.8/km). The racial makeup of the city was 72.56% White, 26.48% African American, 0.18% Native American, 0.30% Asian, 0.09% from other races, and 0.39% from two or more races. Hispanic or Latino of any race were 0.69% of the population.

There were 1,275 households, out of which 35.5% had children under the age of 18 living with them, 45.8% were married couples living together, 21.0% had a female householder with no husband present, and 30.8% were non-families. 28.4% of all households were made up of individuals, and 12.9% had someone living alone who was 65 years of age or older. The average household size was 2.47 and the average family size was 3.02.

In the city, the population was spread out, with 28.2% under the age of 18, 8.7% from 18 to 24, 26.0% from 25 to 44, 21.8% from 45 to 64, and 15.4% who were 65 years of age or older. The median age was 36 years. For every 100 females, there were 87.7 males. For every 100 females age 18 and over, there were 79.5 males.

The median income for a household in the city was $27,422, and the median income for a family was $34,464. Males had a median income of $30,705 versus $21,045 for females. The per capita income for the city was $14,639. About 22.6% of families and 25.0% of the population were below the poverty line, including 36.9% of those under age 18 and 17.5% of those age 65 or over.

Education
New Madrid County R-I School District operates six schools in and around New Madrid, including New Madrid County Central high school.

New Madrid has a lending library, a branch of the New Madrid County Library.

Government 
The city of New Madrid is located in Missouri's 8th congressional district.

Philip Raidt, who was born in Württemberg, Germany in 1825, helped to organize the first free school in New Madrid County. In April 1884, he was elected mayor of the city of New Madrid, but he did not serve. In the fall of 1884, he became a candidate for county judge and was elected to this position.

From 1937 to 1994, all mayors of New Madrid were affiliated with the democratic party.

See also 
1865 Memphis earthquake
 List of New Madrid mayors

References

External links 

 
 Historic maps of New Madrid in the Sanborn Maps of Missouri Collection at the University of Missouri

Gallery 

Cities in Missouri
Cities in New Madrid County, Missouri
Missouri populated places on the Mississippi River
County seats in Missouri
Populated places established in 1788
French colonial settlements of Upper Louisiana
1788 establishments in New Spain